Edward Marjoribanks (14 February 1900 – 2 April 1932) was a barrister and Conservative Party politician in the United Kingdom.

Marjoribanks was educated at Eton and Oxford, subsequently being called to the Bar. At the 1929 general election, he was elected as Member of Parliament (MP) for Eastbourne in East Sussex, and held the seat at the 1931 general election.

He died in office on 2 April 1932, committing suicide by shooting himself in the chest while in the billiard room of his stepfather, Lord Hailsham's house in Sussex.  He had been jilted for a second time. Marjoribanks had just completed the first volume of a planned three-volume account of the trials of Sir Edward Carson; his last chapter being the George Archer-Shee case. The work was finished by another author. At the  resulting 1932 Eastbourne by-election, the Conservative candidate John Slater was returned unopposed.

At the time of his death, Marjoribanks was heir presumptive to the hereditary peerage held by his cousin, Lord Tweedmouth (the title became extinct in 1935).  His half-brother and second cousin was Quintin Hogg, Baron Hailsham of St Marylebone.

Books
He wrote a biography of Sir Edward Marshall Hall published under the following titles:
 The Life of Sir Edward Marshall Hall, Victor Gollancz Ltd, London 1929.
 Famous Trials of Marshall Hall, Penguin Books, Series number 778, July 1950
 Famous Trials of Marshall Hall, Penguin, 1989.

References

External links 
 

1900 births
1932 suicides
Conservative Party (UK) MPs for English constituencies
UK MPs 1929–1931
UK MPs 1931–1935
Suicides by firearm in England
British politicians who committed suicide
Presidents of the Oxford Union
People educated at Eton College
English barristers